CPA4 may refer to:
CPA4 (gene)
Simcoe (Dennison Field) Airport, Ontario, Canada: Transport Canada Location Indicator CNN3